Vernon T. "Skippy" Stivers (December 18, 1903 – May 8, 1985) was a college football and baseball player. Stiver played at quarterback for the Idaho Vandals football team, and starred throughout the 1924 season, despite two dislocated vertebrae in his neck.

References

External links
 
 

1903 births
1985 deaths
American football quarterbacks
Idaho Vandals football players
Saint Louis Billikens baseball coaches
Saint Louis Billikens football coaches
San Francisco Seals (baseball) players